Shaimaa Abdul-Aziz Muhammad (born March 30, 1981 in Giza) is an Egyptian table tennis player. She won a silver medal, along with her partner Moselhi Emad, in the mixed doubles at the 2007 All-Africa Games in Algiers, Algeria. As of March 2013, Abdul-Aziz is ranked no. 566 in the world by the International Table Tennis Federation (ITTF). She is also right-handed, and uses the classic grip.

Abdul-Aziz made her official debut, as a 19-year-old, at the 2000 Summer Olympics in Sydney, where she competed in both singles and doubles tournaments. For her first event, the women's singles, Abdul-Aziz placed third in the preliminary pool round against Russia's Galina Melnik and Hong Kong's Wong Ching, receiving a total score of 74 points, and two straight losses. In the women's doubles, Abdul-Aziz and her partner Osman Bacent repeated their position in the preliminary pool round against Sweden's Åsa and Marie Svensson, and Belarus' Viktoria Pavlovich and Tatyana Kostromina, attaining only a total score of 45 points and losing four straight matches.

Eight years after competing in her last Olympics, Abdul-Aziz qualified for her second Egyptian team, as a 27-year-old, at the 2008 Summer Olympics in Beijing, by receiving a place as one of the top 6 seeded players from the All-Africa Games in Algiers, Algeria. She lost the preliminary round match of the women's singles tournament to Chinese Taipei's Pan Li-chun, with a unanimous set score of 0–4.

References

External links
 
 NBC 2008 Olympics profile

1981 births
Living people
Egyptian female table tennis players
Table tennis players at the 2000 Summer Olympics
Table tennis players at the 2008 Summer Olympics
Olympic table tennis players of Egypt
Sportspeople from Giza
African Games silver medalists for Egypt
African Games medalists in table tennis
African Games bronze medalists for Egypt
Competitors at the 2007 All-Africa Games